The flag of Paraguay was first adopted in 1842. Its design, a red–white–blue triband, was inspired by the colours of the French Tricolour, believed to signify independence and liberty. The flag is unusual because it differs on its obverse and reverse sides: the obverse of the flag shows the national coat of arms, and the reverse shows the seal of the treasury. It was revised in 2013 to bring the flag towards its original design. It has a ratio of 11:20.

Description
Officially adopted in 1842 (following the Recomendación, i. e. : address, de la Junta gubernativa de Asunción), each side of this tricolour flag contains a horizontal tricolor of red, white and blue with the national emblem centered on the white band. The colours of the flag are believed to be inspired from the flag of France to show independence and liberty, and the coat of arms represents the independence of Paraguay. 

 The emblem on the obverse side is the national coat of arms of Paraguay: a yellow five-pointed star surrounded by a green wreath of palm and olive leaves tied with ribbons of the colour of the stripes, and capped by the words REPUBLICA DEL PARAGUAY ("Republic of Paraguay" in Spanish), all within two concentric circles).

 The emblem on the reverse side is the seal of the treasury: a yellow lion below a red Phrygian cap on the top of a pole (symbolising courage) and the words Paz y Justicia ("Peace and Justice"). 

The differences in the obverse and reverse sides comes from the period when José de Francia was in power (1814–1840). On July 15, 2013, the flag was revised. The coat of arms was simplified and the design was brought closer to its original form.

Colours scheme

Historical flags

Flags of subdivisions

Departments

See also
 Coat of arms of Paraguay
 Flags whose reverse differs from the obverse

References

External links

1842 introductions
Paraguay
National symbols of Paraguay
Paraguay
Paraguay